Songs: The Art of the Trio Volume Three is an album by American pianist and composer Brad Mehldau released on the Warner Bros. label in 1998. It was produced by Matt Pierson.

Reception

AllMusic awarded the album 4½ stars and in its review by Steve Huey, stated "this is a fine program easily recommended to straight-ahead collectors". For the New Statesman, Richard Cook wrote that "Songs enters the piano tradition without a murmur of protest while still offering music that is bursting loose of the accepted trinity of piano, bass and drums."

Track listing 
All compositions by Brad Mehldau except as indicated
 "Song-Song" - 6:29
 "Unrequited" - 6:07
 "Bewitched, Bothered and Bewildered" (Lorenz Hart, Richard Rodgers) - 5:57
 "Exit Music (For a Film)" (Radiohead) - 4:23
 "At a Loss" - 6:19
 "Convalescent" - 5:58
 "For All We Know" (J. Fred Coots, Sam M. Lewis) - 7:59
 "River Man" (Nick Drake) - 4:47
 "Young at Heart" (Carolyn Leigh, Johnny Richards) - 6:20
 "Sehnsucht" - 4:56

Personnel 
Brad Mehldau – piano
Larry Grenadier – double bass 
Jorge Rossy – drums

Production
Matt Pierson – producer
James Farber – engineering
Greg Calbi – mastering 
Dana Watson – production coordination 
Tom Tavee – photography 
Art Direction and Design by Rey International

References 

Warner Records albums
Brad Mehldau albums
1998 albums
Albums produced by Matt Pierson